Media.Monks is a digital-first marketing, advertising, and technology services company that connects content, data and digital media and technology services and produces websites, games, films, social media content, digital advertising campaigns, data and measurement solutions, and more. The company's head office is based in Hilversum, the Netherlands. MediaMonks, without the period, was founded in 2001 by Wesley ter Haar, Gin Roberscheuten and Terrence Koeman and was managed by Victor Knaap, who joined the company in 2003. 
Media.Monks joined the Society of Digital Agencies (SoDA) in 2012, with Ter Haar serving as chairman of that collective today.  MediaMonks won 23 Lions at Cannes, including one for the Universal Typeface Experiment, in 2014.

In July 2018, S4 Capital purchased MediaMonks for $350 million.

In January 2020, MediaMonks was the first company to be awarded 200 FWA awards. 

In January 2021, S4, which described itself as an "anti-holding company" added Decoded to MediaMonks, its content company, and Metric Theory to its data and digital media company Mighty Hive. Joining MediaMonks in March was Jam3. In August, all 24 S4 companies became part of the new company Media.Monks, and culture agency Cashmere became part of that company. Other mergers include TheoremOne, and XX Artists, both in 2022.

References

External links

Mass media companies of the Netherlands
Advertising agencies of the Netherlands
Digital marketing companies
Film production companies of the Netherlands
2001 establishments in the Netherlands